The Collector is a Canadian thriller film, released in 2002. Written and directed by Jean Beaudin based on the crime novel of the same name by Chrystine Brouillet, the film stars Maude Guérin as Maude Graham, a police detective trying to track down a serial killer (Luc Picard) while simultaneously sheltering two homeless teenagers, a 16 year old hustler (Lawrence Arcouette) and a 12 year old runaway (Charles-André Bourassa).

The film garnered several Genie Award and Jutra Award nominations in 2003. Picard won the Jutra for Best Supporting Actor.

References

External links 
 

2002 films
Canadian thriller films
Films directed by Jean Beaudin
2002 thriller films
French-language Canadian films
2000s Canadian films